Michael Savage,  (born 20 June 1959) is a British sociologist and academic, specialising in social class. Since 2014 he has been the Martin White Professor of Sociology at the London School of Economics and Political Science (LSE), the post traditionally awarded to the most senior professor in the department. In addition to being Head of the Sociology Department between 2013-2016, Savage also held the position of Director of LSE's International Inequalities Institute between 2015-2020. He previously taught at the University of Manchester and the University of York.

Honours
In 2007, Savage was elected a Fellow of the British Academy (FBA), the United Kingdom's national academy for the humanities and social sciences.

Selected works
 Savage, Mike (1987). The Dynamics of Working-Class Politics: The Labour Movement in Preston, 1880–1940. Cambridge: Cambridge University Press. 
Savage, Mike; Barlow, James; Dickens, Peter; Fielding, Tony (1992). Property, Bureaucracy and Culture: Middle-Class Formation in Contemporary Britain. London: Routledge.
Savage, Mike; Witz, Anne (eds.) (1992). Gender and Bureaucracy. Oxford: Blackwell.

 Savage, Mike; Miles, Andrew (1994). The Remaking of the British Working Class, 1840–1940. London: Routledge. 
Butler, Tim; Savage, Mike (eds.) (1995). Social Change and the Middle Classes. London: UCL Press. 
Halford, Susan; Savage, Mike; Witz, Anne (eds.) (1997). Gender, Careers and Organizations: Current Developments in Banking, Nursing and Local Government. London: Macmillan. 
Savage, Mike (2000). Class Analysis and Social Transformation. Open University Press.
Savage, Mike; Naidoo, Prem (eds.) (2002). Popularisation of Science and Technology Education: Some Case Studies from South Africa. London: Commonwealth Secretariat.

 
Savage, Mike; Bagnall, Gaynor; Longhurst, Brian (2005). Globalization and Belonging. London: Sage.
 Blokland, Talja; Savage, Mike (2008). Networked Urbanism: Social Capital in the City. Ashgate. 
Savage, Mike; Williams, Karel (eds.) (2008). Remembering Elites. Oxford: Blackwell. 
Bennett, Tony; Savage, Mike; Silva, Elizabeth; Warde, Alan; Gayo-Cal, Modesto; Wright, David (eds.) (2009). Culture, Class, Distinction. Abingdon: Routledge. 
 
 Atkinson, Will; Roberts, Steven; Savage, Mike (eds.) (2012). Class Inequality in Austerity Britain: Power, Difference and Suffering. Basingstoke: Palgrave Macmillan.
Wolff, Janet; Savage, Mike (eds.) (2013). Culture in Manchester: Institutions and Urban Change since 1850. Manchester: Manchester University Press.

Hanquinet, Laurie; Savage, Mike (eds.) (2016). Routledge International Handbook of the Sociology of Art and Culture. Abingdon: Routledge.
Korsnes, Olav; Heilbron, Johan; Hjellbrekke, Johs.; Bühlmann, Felix; Savage, Mike (eds.) (2017). New Directions in Elite Studies. Routledge.

References

British sociologists
Academics of the University of Manchester
Academics of the University of York
Academics of the London School of Economics
Fellows of the British Academy
1959 births
Living people